Jeffrey Daryl Friesen (born August 5, 1976) is a Canadian former professional ice hockey player. He played over 800 games in the National Hockey League, spending roughly half his career with the San Jose Sharks, who drafted him in the 1994 NHL Entry Draft. The rest of his career was spent with the Mighty Ducks of Anaheim, New Jersey Devils, Washington Capitals, and Calgary Flames. He won the Stanley Cup with the Devils in 2003.

Playing career
Friesen played his junior years with the Regina Pats of the Western Hockey League (WHL) where he was Rookie of the Year in 1993.  He was selected 11th overall in the first round of the 1994 NHL Entry Draft by the San Jose Sharks. He played 14 season in the NHL as a winger, originally as a left winger but also as a right winger.

Friesen played nearly seven seasons with the Sharks, becoming their 3rd all-time leading scorer, but was traded to the Mighty Ducks of Anaheim near the end of the 2000–01 season. After playing the following season with the Ducks, he was traded to the New Jersey Devils for the 2002–03 season where he won the Stanley Cup. In the Eastern Conference Finals against the Ottawa Senators that year, Friesen scored the game-winning goal with just under three minutes left in regulation in Game 7.  It was his third game-winning goal of the series. Then in Game 7 of the finals, he scored two goals against his former team, the Ducks en route to the Devils' third Stanley Cup championship.

On September 26, 2005, the salary cap troubled Devils traded Friesen to the Washington Capitals in exchange for a conditional 2006 draft pick. On March 9, 2006, he was moved again to the Ducks for a second-round draft pick, but spent a significant part of the 2005–06 season sidelined with a groin injury.

Friesen was signed by the Calgary Flames on July 5, 2006 to a 1-year $1.6 million contract for the 2006–07 season. After a disappointing season that had Friesen producing six goals and six assists in seventy-two games, the Calgary Flames chose not to re-sign him. He played in the AHL as a left wing for the Lake Erie Monsters before January 29, 2008, when Friesen was released.

Friesen attended the San Jose Sharks' 2008 training camp on a tryout basis. On October 9, 2008, Sharks Executive Vice President and General Manager Doug Wilson announced that Friesen had been released from training camp. On August 29, 2009, Friesen signed a one-year contract with Eisbären Berlin of the Deutsche Eishockey Liga (DEL).

Jeff is tied with Jamie Baker for the Sharks single-season short-handed goals record with 6, set in the 1997–98 season.  On February 21, 2015 he returned to San Jose (Santa Clara) where he was introduced along with several other former Shark players before the outdoor Stadium Series game vs. the L.A. Kings at Levi's Stadium in Santa Clara.

Personal life
Friesen and his ex-wife Rhonda have a daughter and son together.

Career statistics

Regular season and playoffs

International

Awards

CHL/WHL
 Jim Piggott Memorial Trophy - 1993
 CHL Rookie of the Year - 1993
 CHL All-Rookie Team - 1993

NHL
NHL All-Rookie Team - 1995

References

External links

1976 births
Living people
Calgary Flames players
Canadian expatriate ice hockey players in Germany
Canadian expatriate ice hockey players in the United States
Canadian ice hockey left wingers
Canadian people of Norwegian descent
Eisbären Berlin players
Ice hockey people from Saskatchewan
Lake Erie Monsters players
Mighty Ducks of Anaheim players
National Hockey League first-round draft picks
New Jersey Devils players
Regina Pats players
San Jose Sharks draft picks
San Jose Sharks players
Sportspeople from Meadow Lake, Saskatchewan
Stanley Cup champions
Washington Capitals players